is a landmark UK company law case. The effect of the House of Lords' unanimous ruling was to uphold firmly the doctrine of corporate personality, as set out in the Companies Act 1862, so that creditors of an insolvent company could not sue the company's shareholders for payment of outstanding debts.

Facts
Mr Aron Salomon made leather boots or shoes as a sole proprietor. His sons wanted to become business partners, so he turned the business into a limited liability company. This company purchased Salomon's business at an excessive price for its value. His wife and five elder children became subscribers and the two elder sons became directors. Mr Salomon took 20,001 of the company's 20,007 shares which was payment from A Salomon & Co Limited for his old business (each share was valued at £1). Transfer of the business took place on 1 June 1892. The company also issued to Mr Salomon £10,000 in debentures. On the security of his debentures, Mr Salomon received an advance of £5,000 from Edmund Broderip.

Soon after Mr Salomon incorporated his business there was a decline in boot sales. The company failed, defaulting on its interest payments on its debentures (half held by Broderip). Broderip sued to enforce his security. The company was put into liquidation. Broderip was repaid his £5,000. This left £1,055 company assets remaining, of which Salomon claimed under the retained debentures he retained. If Salomon's claim was successful this would leave nothing for the unsecured creditors. When the company failed, the company's liquidator contended that the floating charge should not be honoured, and Salomon should be made responsible for the company's debts. Salomon sued.

Issues
The liquidator, on behalf of the company, counter-claimed wanting the amounts paid to Salomon paid back, and his debentures cancelled. He argued that Salomon had breached his fiduciary duty to the new company he was promoting by selling his business for an excessive price. He also argued that the whole formation of the company in this way was intended as a fraud against its potential unsecured creditors in the future.

Judgment

Trial Court
At first instance, Judge Vaughan Williams ruled in the case entitled Broderip v Salomon that Mr Broderip's claim was valid. It was undisputed that the 200 shares were fully paid up. He said the company had a right of indemnity against Mr Salomon. He said the signatories of the memorandum of incorporation were mere "dummies" and that the company was really just Mr Salomon in another form, an alias or at least, his agent. Therefore, it was entitled to indemnity from the principal. The liquidator amended the counter claim, and an award was made for indemnity. The agency argument was accepted.

Court of Appeal

The Court of Appeal confirmed Vaughan Williams J's decision against Mr Salomon, though on the grounds that Mr Salomon had abused the privileges of incorporating a limited liability company, which Parliament had intended only to confer on "independent not counterfeit shareholders, who had a mind and will of their own and were not mere puppets". Lindley LJ (an expert on partnership law) held that the company was a trustee for Mr Salomon and, as such, Salomon was bound to indemnify the company's debts.

Lopes LJ and Kay LJ variously described the company as a myth and a fiction and said that the incorporation of the business by Mr Salomon had been a mere scheme to enable him to carry on as before but with his personal liability for debt limited.

House of Lords

The House of Lords unanimously overturned this decision, rejecting the arguments of agency. They held that there was nothing in the Act about whether the subscribers (i.e., the shareholders) should be independent of the majority shareholder. The company was duly constituted in law and it was not the function of judges to read into the statute limitations they themselves considered expedient. Lord Halsbury LC stated that the statute "enacts nothing as to the extent or degree of interest which may be held by each of the seven [shareholders] or as to the proportion of interest or influence possessed by one or the majority over the others." His judgment continued.

Lord Herschell noted the potentially "far reaching" implications of the Court of Appeal's logic and that in recent years many companies had been set up in which one or more of the seven shareholders were "disinterested persons" who did not wield any influence over the management of the company. Anyone dealing with such a company was aware of its nature as such, and could by consulting the register of shareholders become aware of the breakdown of share ownership among the shareholders.

Lord Macnaghten asked what was wrong with Mr. Salomon taking advantage of the provisions set out in the statute, as he was perfectly legitimately entitled to do. It was not the function of judges to read limitations into a statute on the basis of their own personal view that, if the laws of the land allowed such a thing, they were "in a most lamentable state", as Malins V-C had stated in an earlier case in point, In Re Baglan Hall Colliery Co., which had likewise been overturned by the House of Lords. The key parts of his judgement were as follows.

Significance

Salomon's case still represents the orthodox view of separate legal personality under English law, although a number of exceptions have since evolved.  In Williams & Humbert v W & H Trade Marks [1986] AC 368 at 429B Lord Templeman described as "heretical" the suggestion that this principle should be ignored.  In E.B.M. Co Limited v Dominion Bank [1937] 3 All ER 555 at 564 Lord Russell of Killowen stated the principle was one of "supreme importance".  In Adams v Cape Industries plc [1990] Ch 433 Slade LJ said "the court is not free to disregard the principle of Salomon v A Salomon & Co Ltd [1897] AC 22 merely because it considers that justice so requires. Our law, for better or worse, recognises the creation of subsidiary companies, which though in one sense the creatures of their parent companies, will nevertheless under the general law fall to be treated as separate legal entities with all the rights and liabilities which would normally attach to separate legal entities."  In  at paragraph 66 Lord Neuberger called Salomon: "a clear and principled decision, which has stood unimpeached for over a century".

In the decades since Salomon's case, various exceptional circumstances have been delineated, both by legislatures and the judiciary, in England and elsewhere (including Ireland) when courts can legitimately disregard a company's separate legal personality, such as where crime or fraud has been committed. There is therefore much debate as to whether the same decision would be reached if the same facts were considered in the modern legal environment, given the House of Lords' decisions in Pepper v Hart and Re Spectrum Plus Ltd and the Privy Council in Attorney General of Belize v Belize Telecom Ltd that require a purposive approach to interpreting legislation.  In 2013 there was a systemic review of these authorities in Prest v Petrodel Resources Ltd and Lord Sumption distinguished between cases of truly "piercing the corporate veil" and situations where it was held that the company was essentially an agent for a wrongdoer or held property on trust.

Although Salomon's case is cited in court to this day, it has met with considerable criticism. For example, Otto Kahn-Freund called the decision "calamitous" in his article published at [1944] 7 MLR 54. In that article, the author also called for the abolition of private companies.

Reform

Shortly after the decision was handed down the Preferential Payments in Bankruptcy Amendment Act 1897 was passed into law as a response.  The effect of that statute was to provide that certain classes of preferred creditors would take priority over the claims of a secured creditor under a floating charge.  However, the effectiveness of that Act was limited by the fact that a floating charge crystallises into a fixed charge prior to enforcement, and so it was not until the Insolvency Act 1986 modified the provision to state that a floating charge include any charge which was created as a floating charge (i.e. irrespective of subsequent crystallisation) that priority of the preferred creditors was promoted ahead of the floating chargeholders.

See also

Corporate law
Berkey v. Third Avenue Railway 244 N.Y. 602, 155 N.E. 914 (1927) a leading case on separate personhood in US corporate law
Lee v Lee’s Air Farming Ltd

Notes

References
[1897] 13 LQR 6
O Kahn Freund, [1944] 7 MLR 54

House of Lords cases
United Kingdom company case law
Lord Lindley cases
United Kingdom corporate personality case law
1896 in British law
1896 in case law